Low Life, Low-Life, or Lowlife(s) may refer to:

Low-life, a person considered morally unacceptable by their community

Film
The Low Life, a 1995 American film by George Hickenlooper
Low Life (film), a 2004 South Korean film by Im Kwon-taek
Lowlife (2012 film), a Canadian horror film by Seth A. Smith
Lowlife (2017 film), an American film by Ryan Prows

Literature
Low Life (book), a 1991 book by Luc Sante
Low Life (comics), a 2000 AD comic story in the world of Judge Dredd 
Lowlife (comics), a 1992–1995 series by Ed Brubaker
Lowlifes, a 2018 IDW Publishing comics series

Music
Low Life Records, a British record label
Lowlife (band), a 1985–1997 Scottish band

Albums
Low-Life, by New Order, 1985
Low Life (Peter Brötzmann and Bill Laswell album) or the title song, 1987
Lowlife: The Paris Concert, by Tim Berne, 1995
Low Life (EP), by Massive Ego, or the title song, 2014

Songs
"Low Life" (song), by Future, 2016
"Lowlife" (song), by Poppy, 2015
"Low Life", by the 4-Skins from The Good, The Bad & The 4-Skins, 2007 reissue
"Low Life", by Bryan Adams, the B-side of "Have You Ever Really Loved a Woman?", 1995
"Low Life", by Death from Spiritual Healing, 1990
"Lowlife", by John Eddie
"Low Life", by the Police, the B-side of "Spirits in the Material World", 1981
"Lowlife", by Theory of a Deadman from The Truth Is..., 2011
"Low Life", by Ufo361, 2021
"Low Life", by X Ambassadors from VHS, 2015
"Low Life", by ZieZie, 2017